This is a list of female archivists.

See also 
 List of archivists
 List of female librarians
 Lists of women

Archivists
female archivists